Fort Boyard is a fort located between the Île-d'Aix and the Île d'Oléron in the Pertuis d'Antioche straits, on the west coast of France and is the filming location for the eponymous TV game show (1990 – present). Though a fort on Boyard bank was suggested as early as the 17th century, it was not until the 1800s under Napoleon Bonaparte that work began. Building started in 1801 and was completed in 1857. In 1967, the final scene of the French film Les aventuriers was filmed at the remains of the fort.

Layout 

At the centre is a yard, and the ground floor provided stores and quarters for the men and officers. The floor above contained casemates for the emplacements of guns and further quarters. Above that were facilities for barbette guns and mortars.

History
The construction of the fort was first considered during a build-up of the French armed forces undertaken by Louis XIV between 1661 and 1667. Fort Boyard was to form a line of fortification with Fort Enet and Fort de la Rade on Île-d'Aix to protect the arsenal of Rochefort from Royal Navy incursions. With the limited range of artillery in the 17th century, there was an unprotected gap between the fields of fire of the fortifications on the islands of Aix and Oléron; a fort on Boyard bank, roughly midway between the two, would have filled that gap. In 1692 the French engineer Descombs began planning the programme of building the fort; however, once it became clear how expensive it would be the scheme was abandoned. Vauban, Louis XIV's leading military engineer, famously advised against it, saying "Your Majesty, it would be easier to seize the moon with your teeth than to attempt such an undertaking in such a place".

After a British raid on Île-d'Aix in 1757, plans for a fort on Boyard bank were once again considered. Though plans were drawn up, it was abandoned again due to the logistical problems. Efforts were renewed under Napoleon Bonaparte in 1800, and the following year engineers Ferregeau and Armand Samuel de Marescot, and Vice-Admiral François Étienne de Rosily-Mesros designed a fort to be built on the bank. To facilitate the work, a port was established on île d'Oléron. The village of Boyardville was built for the workers. To this end, stones were piled up on the bank.

The project was suspended in 1809. Construction resumed in 1837, under Louis-Philippe, following renewed tensions with the United Kingdom. The fortifications were completed in 1857, with sufficient room for a garrison of 250 men; however, by this time the range of cannons had significantly increased, covering the hitherto unprotected gap and making the fort unnecessary.

After 1871, Fort Boyard was briefly used as a military prison, and abandoned in 1913, after which the unmaintained fort slowly deteriorated and crumbled into the sea. In 1950 it was made a listed building, and in 1961 was sold to Charente Maritime Regional Council.

In 1989, the reconstruction of fort began in preparation for hosting the game show. An access platform for the berth of ships was built 25 meters from it (the old fort pier was destroyed long ago). The fort was completely cleared of a huge layer of guano (50 cm thick). In 1996, artillery platforms were also restored. However, the fort was still exposed to harmful influences from the sea. Therefore, in 1998, additional restoration work was carried out. The outer walls were completely cleaned and the sealing of the terrace completed. The final stage was the restoration of a central courtyard which was completed in early 2004. It has been used as the location for the filming of both the French and international versions of the TV game show of the same name since 1990, and was also the location for filming The Last Adventure, starring Alain Delon, Lino Ventura and Joanna Shimkus.

In popular culture 

 First-person shooter Counter-Strike: Global Offensive has a map called "de_boyard" based off of Fort Boyard.

References
Notes

Bibliography

External links
 

Boyard
Buildings and structures in Charente-Maritime
Sea forts
Military history of France
Artificial islands of France
Boyard, Fort
Islands of Charente-Maritime
1857 establishments in France